The Ven. Bernard Lee Holdridge SSC (24 July 1935 – 4 September 2021) was the Archdeacon of Doncaster from 1994 to 2001.
 
Holdridge was educated at  Thorne Grammar School and Lichfield Theological College; and ordained in 1968. After a curacy in Swinton he held incumbencies in Hexthorpe, Rawmarsh and Worksop. He had been a Guardian of the Shrine of Our Lady of Walsingham since 1996.

References

1935 births
2021 deaths
People associated with York St John University
Alumni of Lichfield Theological College
Archdeacons of Doncaster
People from Thorne, South Yorkshire
People educated at Thorne Grammar School